Pathfinder International is a global non-profit organization 501(c)(3) that focuses on sexual and reproductive health and rights, including reproductive health, family planning, HIV/AIDS prevention and care, and maternal and newborn health. The organization operates in more than 15 low- and middle-income countries in Africa and South Asia. According to its website, "Pathfinder is driven by the conviction that all people, regardless of where they live, have the right to decide whether and when to have children, to exist free from fear and stigma, and to lead the lives they choose."

History
Pathfinder International was originally incorporated as The Pathfinder Fund in 1957. Its family planning work began in the late 1920s when its founder Clarence Gamble, heir of the Procter & Gamble soap company fortune, supported efforts to introduce contraception to women and couples in the United States and 60 other countries. In addition to his eugenicist work, he worked towards easy access to contraception in minority communities. He also launched the first community-based service model, which is still the foundation of Pathfinder's operations.

Sarah Gamble, Clarence Gamble's wife, named the organization in honor of a quote by the poet Antonio Machado, "Traveler, there is no path, paths are made by walking."

Pathfinder surpassed revenue of US$100 million for the first time in the 2010 fiscal year. In 2011, Pathfinder announced the retirement of Daniel E. Pellegrom, the longest-serving president of a global reproductive health organization in history after becoming CEO of Pathfinder International in 1985. In 2012, Purnima Mane joined Pathfinder as president and CEO, after serving as deputy director of United Nations Population Fund.

Lois Quam, named three times to Fortune magazine's list of the most influential women leaders in business, became Pathfinder's President and CEO in 2017. She was chief operating officer of The Nature Conservancy and a senior advisor to Hillary Clinton's presidential campaign. She was selected by President Barack Obama to head his signature Global Health Initiative at the Department of State, which provided more than $8 billion annually to help solve major health challenges facing millions of individuals across 80 countries. In 2022, Dr. Tabinda Sarosh was named President, South Asia, Middle East, and North Africa.

Pathfinder was one of several nonprofits mentioned in the book Half the Sky: Turning Oppression into Opportunity for Women Worldwide, by Nicholas Kristof and Sheryl WuDunn and first published in September 2009.

Activities
Pathfinder International works with many organizations, ranging from national ministries of health to local NGOs, to deliver reproductive health, family planning information, and services to women, young adults, and rural populations. Pathfinder's programs also integrate HIV/AIDS prevention and treatment activities. The group has worked with UN Women, the UNFPA, the World Bank, and a number of other partners to organize different programs and projects.

Pathfinder's programs in more than 15 countries in Africa and South Asia expand access to modern contraception and comprehensive abortion care, and improve adolescent and youth sexual and reproductive health, fostering gender equality and resilience.

Locations

Africa

 Burkina Faso
 Burundi
 Côte d'Ivoire
 Democratic Republic of Congo
 Egypt
 Ethiopia
 Kenya
 Mozambique
 Niger
 Nigeria
 Tanzania
 Togo
 Uganda

Asia and Pacific

 Bangladesh
 India
 Pakistan

Funding
A little over half of the group's $130 million in funding came from the United States Agency for International Development in fiscal year 2019. In addition, the organization receives funding from multilateral organizations, private foundations, and individuals. As part of the President's Emergency Plan for AIDS Relief, U.S. government support for AIDS prevention was contingent on opposing prostitution starting in 2003. Pathfinder preferred to remain neutral so as not to alienate sex workers from its anti-HIV efforts, so it sued in federal court with other non-profit organizations. In 2013, the U.S. Supreme Court found that the requirement violated the First Amendment's prohibition against compelled speech in Agency for International Development v. Alliance for Open Society International, Inc. In early 2015, the U.S. Supreme Court returned with another ruling in favor of the Alliance for Open Society International. The latest decision affirmed a 2013 decision by the U.S. Supreme Court, which found that the government cannot tell its American grantees what they can and cannot say.

Criticism
Like many older birth control organizations, Pathfinder initially overlapped with the eugenics movement. The founder, Clarence Gamble, was a member of Human Betterment League of North Carolina and advocated forced sterilization of mental patients.

During the 1970s, the organization was accused of distributing unsafe contraceptives. Specifically, Pathfinder continued to distribute the Dalkon Shield internationally after it had been withdrawn from the U.S. market due to high infection rates and used Depo-Provera when it was still considered experimental prior to FDA approval.

In 2022 Pathfinder started a process of reckoning with its history and has donated its archives to Harvard University, where researchers can freely access them.

References

External links
 Non-Profit Report from GuideStar

International medical and health organizations
Medical and health organizations based in Massachusetts
HIV/AIDS prevention organizations
Health charities in the United States
Eugenics